Islan Nettles was an African American transgender woman who was killed on August 17, 2013.

Killing 
Islan Nettles was beaten to death in Harlem just after midnight on August 17, 2013. The killer, James Dixon, was not indicted until March 2015, despite turning himself in three days after the attack and confessing that he had flown into "a blind fury" when he realized that Nettles was a transgender woman. Dixon pleaded not guilty to first-degree manslaughter at his indictment. Dixon was not charged with murder, which would have required proof of intent, nor was he charged with a hate crime. During his confession, Dixon said that his friends had mocked him for flirting with Nettles, not realizing that she was transgender. Furthermore, in an incident a few days prior to the beating, his friends had teased him after he flirted with two transgender women while he was doing pull-ups on a scaffolding at 138th Street and Eighth Avenue. Dixon pleaded guilty and received a sentence of 12 years' imprisonment, a sentence that Nettles' mother felt was too lenient.

Trans Lives Matter!: Justice for Islan Nettles is a seven-minute film that focuses on Nettles' killing. The film was screened by PBS Channel 13, as well as the Brooklyn Museum. Other screenings where the film has been featured include Official Selection at the 28th BFI Flare London, LGBT Film Festival, Gender Reel Film Festival, Al Jazeera America, and Black Star Film Festival.

See also 
 Trans panic defense

References 

2013 deaths
Year of birth missing
Violence against trans women
LGBT African Americans
Transgender women
Violence against LGBT people in the United States
2013 in New York City
2010s in Manhattan
August 2013 events in the United States
African-American history in New York City
Women in New York City